Guerrero is a Mexican state.

Guerrero(s) may also refer to:

People

Places 
Antarctica
 Guerrero Glacier

Argentina
 Guerrero, Buenos Aires, a settlement in Castelli Partido

Colombia
  Estadio Olímpico Pascual Guerrero, sports stadium in Santiago de Cali

Mexico
 Guerrero Municipality, Chihuahua
 Guerrero Municipality, Coahuila
 Guerrero, Coahuila
 Guerrero Municipality, Tamaulipas
 Guerrero, Acolman de Nezahualcóyotl, Acolman de Nezahualcóyotl
 Guerrero, Arcelia, Arcelia (municipality)
 Guerrero, Galeana, Galeana, Nuevo León
 Guerrero, Huimanguillo, Huimanguillo
 Guerrero, Libres, Libres (municipality)
 Guerrero, San Miguel de Allende, San Miguel de Allende
 Guerrero, San Pedro Teutila, San Pedro Teutila
 Guerrero, Santiago de Anaya, Santiago de Anaya
 Guerrero, Soto la Marina, Soto la Marina
 Cuilapan de Guerrero, Oaxaca
 Colonia Guerrero, Mexico City
 Guerrero Negro, Baja California Sur
 Guerrero metro station, in Cuauhtémoc, Mexico City
 Guerrero (Mexico City Metrobús), a BRT station in Mexico City
 Montecristo de Guerrero, Chiapas
 Nueva Ciudad Guerrero, Tamaulipas
 Práxedis G. Guerrero, Chihuahua
 Vicente Guerrero, Chihuahua
 Vicente Guerrero, Tlaxcala
 Villa Guerrero, Jalisco

Media
Guerreros, a 2002 Spanish film
Guerrero 12, a 2011 Mexican film
Guerrero (film), a 2016 Peruvian film
Two fictional characters featured in comic book titles published by Azteca Productions:
Agustin Guerrero (comics), the original El Gato Negro
Francisco Guerrero (comics), the modern-day El Gato Negro
 Guerrero, a mercenary in the TV series Human Target
 Soy Guerrero, a statewide television network in Guerrero, Mexico

Other uses
Guerreiro, Galician/Portuguese equivalent
Guerrero, a slave ship
Guerrero Harvest Mouse, a species of rodent
Los Guerreros, a professional wrestling family